Christopher Robert Jones (born 5 November 1990) is a former English cricketer who played for Somerset, who made his County Championship debut in 2010 as a replacement for Craig Kieswetter. He was born in Harold Wood in Havering but moved to Dorset at a young age.

He was educated at Broadstone Middle School and Poole Grammar School before moving on to Durham University to read Economics. He graduated from Durham with a first-class degree in June 2013. He has played first-class cricket with Durham MCCU and was awarded the university's 'sportsman of the year' award in 2011. Jones was called into the Somerset team for a tour match against Australia in July 2013, hitting his first first-class century.

On 15 August 2014, Jones announced his retirement from first-class cricket at the end of the 2014 season to pursue a career outside of the game.

References

External links
 

1990 births
English cricketers
Somerset cricketers
People from Harold Wood
Living people
Dorset cricketers
Durham MCCU cricketers
Alumni of Grey College, Durham